Charles Herbert Lightoller,  (30 March 1874 – 8 December 1952) was a British mariner and naval officer. As the officer in charge of loading passengers into lifeboats on the port side, Lightoller strictly enforced the women and children only protocol, not allowing any male passengers to board the lifeboats unless they were needed as auxiliary seamen. Lightoller served as a commanding officer in the Royal Navy during World War I and was twice decorated for gallantry. During World War II, in retirement, he voluntarily provided his personal yacht, named the Sundowner and sailed her as one of the "little ships" that played a part in the Dunkirk evacuation.

Early life
Charles Herbert Lightoller was born in Chorley, Lancashire, on 30 March 1874, into a family that had operated cotton-spinning mills in Lancashire since the late 18th century. His mother, Sarah Jane Lightoller (née Widdows), died of scarlet fever shortly after giving birth to him. His father, Frederick James Lightoller, emigrated to New Zealand when Charles was 10, leaving him in the care of extended family.

Early maritime career
At age 13, not wanting to end up with a factory job, Charles began a four-year apprenticeship on board the barque Primrose Hill. On his second voyage, he set sail with the crew of the Holt Hill. During a storm in the South Atlantic, the ship was forced to put in at Rio de Janeiro.  Repairs were made in the midst of a smallpox epidemic and a revolution. Another storm, on 13 November 1889 in the Indian Ocean, caused the ship to run aground on an uninhabited four-and-a-half-square-mile island now called Île Saint-Paul. They were rescued by the Coorong and taken to Adelaide, Australia. Lightoller joined the crew of the clipper ship Duke of Abercorn for his return to England.

Lightoller returned to the Primrose Hill for his third voyage. They arrived in Calcutta, India, where he passed his second mate's certificate. The cargo of coal caught fire while he was serving as third mate on board the windjammer Knight of St. Michael, and for his successful efforts in fighting the fire and saving the ship, Lightoller was promoted to second mate.

In 1895, at age 21 and a veteran of the dangers at sea, he obtained his mate's ticket and left sailing ships for steamships. After three years of service in Elder Dempster's African Royal Mail Service on the West African coast, he nearly died from a heavy bout of malaria.

Lightoller went to the Yukon in 1898 to prospect for gold in the Klondike Gold Rush. Failing at this, he then became a cowboy in Alberta, Canada.  In order to return home, he became a hobo, riding the rails back across Canada. He earned his passage back to England by working as a cattle wrangler on a cattle boat and arrived home penniless in 1899.

While on the Medic, on a voyage from Britain to South Africa and Australia, Lightoller was reprimanded for a prank he and some shipmates played on the citizens of Sydney at Fort Denison in Sydney Harbour. In 1903 he found himself in Sydney again, having been transferred to the SS Suevic — possibly as punishment for another indiscretion. During the voyage, he met Sylvia Hawley Wilson, a returning Australian whom he married in St James' Church, Sydney and took back to England on the return passage.

He later joined the  under the command of Captain Edward J. Smith in the Atlantic. He returned to the Majestic as first mate and then transferred back to the Oceanic in the same position.

Titanic
Captain Smith gave the post of chief officer to Henry Wilde of the Olympic, demoting the original appointee William Murdoch to first officer and Lightoller to second officer. The original second officer, David Blair, was excluded from the voyage altogether, while the roster of junior officers remained unchanged. Blair's departure from the crew caused a problem, as he had the key to the ship's binoculars case. Later, the missing key and resultant lack of binoculars for the lookouts in the crow's nest became a point of contention at the U.S. inquiry into the Titanic disaster.

On the night of 14 April 1912, Lightoller commanded the last bridge watch prior to the ship's collision with the iceberg, after which Murdoch relieved him. An hour before the collision, Lightoller ordered the ship's lookouts to continually watch for 'small ice' and 'particularly growlers' until daylight. He then ordered the Quartermaster, Robert Hichens, to check ship's fresh water supply for signs of freezing below the waterline, signs if present would indicate the ship was entering dangerous ice. Lightoller had retired to his cabin and was preparing for bed when he felt the collision. Wearing only his pyjamas, Lightoller hurried out on deck to investigate, but seeing nothing, retired back to his cabin. Deciding it would be better to remain where other officers knew where to find him if needed, he lay awake in his bunk until fourth officer Joseph Boxhall summoned him to the bridge. He pulled on trousers, and a navy-blue sweater over his pyjamas, and donned (along with socks and shoes) his officer's overcoat and cap.

During the evacuation, Lightoller took charge of lowering the lifeboats on the port side of the boat deck. He helped to fill several lifeboats with passengers and launched them. Lightoller interpreted Smith's order for "the evacuation of women and children" as essentially "women and children only". As a result, Lightoller lowered lifeboats with empty seats if there were no women and children waiting to board, meaning to fill them to capacity once they had reached the water. Lieutenant Colonel Arthur Godfrey Peuchen has the distinction of being the only adult male passenger Lightoller allowed into the boats on the port side evacuation, due to his previous nautical experience and offer of assistance when there were no seamen available from the Titanic's own complement to help command one of the lowering lifeboats. There were fears from some of the officers that the davits used for lowering the boats would not hold the weight if the boats were full, but they were unaware that the new davits on the Titanic had been designed to do so. Under this misapprehension, Lightoller's plan was to fill the lifeboats from the waterline and sent 10 men to open the gangway doors in the ship's port so that passengers would have access. The men failed in this task and were never seen again (presumed drowned carrying out this final order). The under-capacity boats then pulled away from the ship as soon as they hit the water, rendering the plan a failure. At least one boat is confirmed as wilfully ignoring officers' shouted orders to return.

When Lightoller attempted to launch Lifeboat 2, he found it was occupied already by 25 male passengers and crewmen. He ordered them out of the boat and threatened them with his unloaded revolver, allegedly saying: "Get out of there, you damned cowards! I'd like to see every one of you overboard!" He then passed the duty of loading Lifeboat 2 over to Fourth Officer Boxhall. While initial accounts varied, it is now believed there were only 17 people aboard the lifeboat, out of a capacity of 40.

As the ship began its final plunge, Lightoller attempted to launch Collapsible B on the port side. This collapsible boat was one of the smaller Engelhardt lifeboats with canvas sides and was stowed atop the officers' quarters. The collapsible fell onto the deck upside down. Lightoller then crossed over to the starboard side of the roof, to see if there was anything further to be done there. As the ship sank, seawater washed over the entire bow, producing a large wave that rolled aft along the boat deck and washed over the bridge. Seeing crowds of people run away from the rising water, Lightoller realized it would be a futile move to head aft and dived into the water from the roof of the officers' quarters. Lightoller described the shock of the water as being like "a thousand knives being driven into one’s body".

Surfacing, Lightoller spotted the ship's crow's nest, now level with the water, and started to swim towards it as a place of safety before remembering that it was safer to stay away from the foundering vessel. Then, as water flooded down one of the forward ventilators, Lightoller was sucked under. He was pinned against the grating for some time by the pressure of the incoming water, until a blast of hot air from the depths of the ship erupted out of the ventilator and blew him to the surface. The suction pulled him down again against another grating, but he resurfaced.  He realized he could not swim properly because of the weight of the Webley revolver he was carrying in his coat pocket, so he swiftly discarded it. Following this, he saw Collapsible B floating upside down with several swimmers hanging on to it. He swam to it and held on to a rope at the front. Then the Titanics Number 1 (forward) funnel broke free and hit the water, washing the collapsible further away from the sinking ship.

Lightoller climbed on the boat and took charge, calming and organising the survivors (numbering around 30) on the overturned lifeboat. He led them in yelling in unison "Boat ahoy!", but with no success. During the night a swell arose, and Lightoller taught the men to shift their weight with the swells to prevent the craft from being swamped.

After the sinking, Lightoller published a testimony in the Christian Science Journal crediting his faith in a divine power for his survival, concluding: "with God all things are possible".

Recommendations at inquiries

As the senior surviving officer, Lightoller was a key witness at both the American and British inquiries. In his autobiography he described the American inquiry as a "farce", due to the ignorance of maritime matters implicit in some of the questions. He took the British inquiry more seriously and wrote "it was very necessary to keep one's hand on the whitewash brush"  as he "had no desire that blame should be attributed either to the B.O.T. (British Board of Trade) or the White Star Line", despite his belief that "one had known, full well, and for many years, the ever-present possibility of just such a disaster".

Lightoller blamed the accident on the seas being the calmest that night that he had ever seen in his life and on the floating icebergs giving no tell-tale early-warning signs of breaking white water at their bases. He deftly defended his employer, the White Star Line, despite hints of excessive speed, a lack of binoculars in the crow's nest, and the plain recklessness of travelling through an ice field on a calm night when all other ships in the vicinity thought it wiser to heave to until morning. Later, however, in a recounting he gave of the night's events on a 1936 BBC I Was There programme, he reversed his defences. Lightoller was also able to help channel public outcry over the incident into positive change, as many of his recommendations for avoiding such accidents in the future were adopted by maritime nations. Basing lifeboat capacity on the number of passengers and crew instead of ship tonnage, conducting lifeboat drills so passengers know where their lifeboats are and crew know how to operate them, instituting manned 24-hour wireless (radio) communications on all passenger ships, and requiring mandatory transmissions of ice warnings to ships, were some of his recommendations at the inquiries which were acted on by the Board of Trade, its successor agencies, and their equivalents in other maritime nations.

First World War
Lightoller returned to duty with White Star Line, serving as a mate on RMS Oceanic. He received a promotion from sub-lieutenant to lieutenant in the Royal Naval Reserve in May 1913. At the outbreak of the First World War, as an officer in the RNR, he was called up for duty with the Royal Navy, first serving as a lieutenant on Oceanic, which had been converted to an armed merchant cruiser (HMS Oceanic). He served on this ship as the ship's First Officer until it ran aground and was wrecked on the notorious Shaalds of Foula on 8 September 1914. He was the last man off the grounded ship, taking the navigation room's clock as a souvenir.

In 1915, he served as the first officer during the trials of another former passenger liner, which had just been converted into an aircraft carrier. In late 1915, he was given his own command, the torpedo boat HMTB 117. Whilst captain of HMTB 117 he was awarded the Distinguished Service Cross for engaging Zeppelin L31 in a prolonged night battle. With the assistance of a lightship, Lightoller and his crew laid an ambush at the mouth of the Thames Estuary, waiting until L31 was directly above the HMTB. Lightoller opened fire on the "Zepp" with tracer rounds eventually hitting its tail and forcing the airship's withdrawal. Lightoller wrote that whilst in command of the Falcon, he kept the ship in a constant state of readiness; the ship's guns were loaded and cleared for action at all times. He expected his men to think and act for themselves in times of an emergency. Falcon was sunk on 1 April 1918 after a collision, in fog, with the trawler, John Fitzgerald, while both ships were acting as escorts to a convoy in the North Sea. Lightoller was quickly exonerated in a court martial for the loss of the ship, and he was commended for remaining on board the ship along with his first officer until the majority of the crew had been evacuated to the boats (apart from three officers who were left trapped in the stern and had to be rescued by a trawler). Lightoller was subsequently given command of the River-class destroyer .

Sinking of UB-110 

In his 1933 memoirs, Kapitänleutnant Fürbringer accused the crew of Garry of both violating the Hague Convention of 1907 and repeating the Baralong incidents by opening fire on the unarmed survivors of UB-110 with revolvers and machine guns. Fürbringer alleged that the shooting only ceased when the convoy the Garry had been escorting, which contained many neutral-flagged ships, arrived on the scene. Fürbringer later recalled, "As if by magic the British now let down some life boats into the water."

While Lightoller does not go into detail about the sinking in his memoir, does confirm Kapitänleutnant Fürbringer's memoirs by admitting that he, "refused to accept the hands up air" business. Lightoller explained, "In fact it was simply amazing that they should have had the infernal audacity to offer to surrender, in view of their ferocious and pitiless attacks on our merchant ships. Destroyer versus Destroyer, as in the Dover Patrol, was fair game and no favour. One could meet them and take them on as a decent antagonist. But towards the submarine men, one felt an utter disgust and loathing; they were nothing but an abomination, polluting the clean sea."  Lightoller was awarded a Bar to the Distinguished Service Cross for sinking SM UB-110. A total of 23 members of UB-110'''s crew died during the action and at the hands of Garry's crew after the sinking.

Subsequent wartime service
On 10 June 1918, Lightoller was awarded the Reserve Decoration. He was promoted to acting lieutenant-commander in July and was placed on the retired list on 31 March 1919, with the rank of commander.

Retirement
After the war, despite his loyal service to White Star Line and having faithfully defended his employers at Titanic inquiries, Lightoller soon found that opportunities for advancement within the line were no longer available. All surviving crewmembers would find that being associated with Titanic was a black mark from which they could not hope to escape. A disillusioned Lightoller resigned shortly thereafter, taking such odd jobs as an innkeeper, a chicken farmer, and later property speculator, at which he and his wife had some success. During the early 1930s, he wrote his autobiography, Titanic and Other Ships, which he dedicated to his "persistent wife, who made me do it". The book eventually became quite popular and began to sell well. It was withdrawn when the Marconi Company threatened a lawsuit, owing to a comment by Lightoller regarding the Titanic disaster and the role of the Marconi operators.

Second World War

The retired Lightoller did not turn his back on sailing altogether, as he eventually purchased a private motor yacht, Sundowner in 1929. In early 1939 he was commissioned by the Admiralty to use Sundowner to tour the German coast to gather information and take photos of German naval installations. This was completed despite Lightoller nearly being caught out near the German naval base at Wilhelmshaven, which he avoided by pretending to be drunk when intercepted by a German naval vessel.

Dunkirk evacuation
In 1940, he, together with his son Roger and a young Sea Scout named Gerald Ashcroft, crossed the English Channel in Sundowner to assist in the Dunkirk evacuation.Manchester, William, and Reid, Paul, "The Last Lion: Winston Spencer Churchill Defender of the Realm 1940–1965", Little, Brown and Company, New York, Boston, London; First edition November 2012, Library of Congress card number 82-42972, pp. 83–84. Rather than allow his motor yacht to be requisitioned by the Admiralty, he sailed the vessel to Dunkirk. In a boat licensed to carry 21 passengers, Lightoller and his crew repatriated 127 British servicemen. On the return journey, Lightoller evaded gunfire from enemy aircraft, using a technique described to him by his youngest son, Herbert, who had joined the RAF and been killed earlier in the war. Gerald Ashcroft later recalled "We attracted the attention of a Stuka dive bomber. Commander Lightoller stood up in the bow and I stood alongside the wheelhouse. Commander Lightoller kept his eye on the Stuka till the last second – then he sang out to me "Hard a port!" and I sang out to Roger and we turned very sharply. The bomb landed on our starboard side."

At the time of the evacuation, Lightoller's second son, Trevor, was a serving second lieutenant with the 3rd Division (Major-General  Bernard Montgomery), which had retreated towards Dunkirk. Unknown to Lightoller senior, Trevor had already been evacuated 48 hours before Sundowner reached Dunkirk.

Subsequent wartime service
Following Dunkirk, Lightoller continued to serve with the Small Vessels Pool until 1946. He was placed in command of a "Small Armed Vessel", patrolling the River Blackwater, Essex during the threatened invasion of 1940–41. He then ferried arms and ammunition for the Royal Army Service Corps until the end of the war. For these services Lightoller was mentioned in despatches in December 1944.

After the Second World War, Lightoller managed a small boatyard in Twickenham, West London, called Richmond Slipways, which built motor launches for the river police.

Family
Lightoller's parents were Frederick James Lightoller and Sarah Jane Widdows. His siblings, Richard Ashton and Caroline Mary Lightoller, both died of scarlet fever in early childhood.

On the return voyage, she accompanied Lightoller as his bride. The couple had five children: Frederic Roger, Richard Trevor, Sylvia Mavis, Claire Doreen, and Herbert Brian. Their youngest son Brian, an RAF pilot, was killed in action on 4 September 1939 in a bombing raid over Wilhelmshaven, Germany, on the first night of Britain's entry into the Second World War.

Their eldest son, Roger, served in the Royal Navy and was killed in March 1945 during the Granville raid whilst commanding a Motor Torpedo Boat. Trevor joined the army and gained the rank of lieutenant colonel, serving under General Bernard Montgomery's command for the duration of the war. Mavis served in the First Aid Nursing Yeomanry, and Doreen in the Political Intelligence Unit. His grandson, A.T. Lightoller, served in the Royal Navy, commanding the submarine  in the early 1970s.

Death
Lightoller died of chronic heart disease on 8 December 1952, aged 78. A long-time pipe smoker, he died during London's Great Smog of 1952. His body was cremated, and his ashes were scattered at the Commonwealth "Garden of Remembrance" at Mortlake Crematorium in Richmond, Surrey.

Portrayals
Herbert Tiede (1943) — Titanic (German film)
 Kenneth More (1958) — A Night to Remember (1958 film) Jonny Phillips (1997) — Titanic''
In the 2017 film Dunkirk, Mark Rylance plays "Mr. Dawson", a character inspired by Lightoller

Notes

References

Further reading

Lightoller, C. H., Cmdr.( 1920).  London: Grove Press.

External links

 BBC Radio Interview with Charles Lightoller about Dunkirk Evacuation

1874 births
1952 deaths
British Merchant Navy officers
British people of World War II
Dunkirk evacuation
English Christian Scientists
Military personnel from Lancashire
People from Chorley
Recipients of the Distinguished Service Cross (United Kingdom)
RMS Titanic's crew and passengers
RMS Titanic survivors
Royal Navy officers of World War I
Royal Naval Volunteer Reserve personnel of World War I
World War I crimes by the British Empire and Commonwealth